Capital punishment is a legal penalty in the U.S. state of South Dakota.

As of November 2019, five condemned, all white males, have been executed since capital punishment was reinstated in the state in 1979; two of those cases were prisoners who waived their normal appeals and chose to be put to death.

Legal process
When the prosecution seeks the death penalty, the sentence is decided by the jury and must be unanimous.

In case of a hung jury during the penalty phase of the trial, a life sentence is issued, even if a single juror opposed death (there is no retrial).

The governor has the power of clemency with respect to death sentences.

Death row is located at the South Dakota State Penitentiary located in Sioux Falls. Lethal injection is the only method of execution provided by statutes.

Capital crimes
First-degree murder is a Class A Felony in South Dakota, punishable by death or life imprisonment without parole. It is the only Class A Felony in the state and can be punished with death if (and only if) it involves any of the following aggravating factors:

 The murder was committed by a person with a prior record of conviction for a Class A or Class B felony, or the offense of murder was committed by a person who has a felony conviction for a crime of violence; 
 The defendant by the defendant's act knowingly created a great risk of death to more than one person in a public place by means of a weapon or device which would normally be hazardous to the lives of more than one person; 
 The murder was committed for the benefit of the defendant or another, for the purpose of receiving money or any other thing of monetary value; 
 The murder was committed on a judicial officer, former judicial officer, prosecutor, or former prosecutor while such prosecutor, former prosecutor, judicial officer, or former judicial officer was engaged in the performance of such person's official duties or where a major part of the motivation for the offense came from the official actions of such judicial officer, former judicial officer, prosecutor, or former prosecutor; 
 The defendant caused or directed another to commit murder or committed murder as an agent or employee of another person; 
 The murder was outrageously or wantonly vile, horrible, or inhuman in that it involved torture, depravity of mind, or an aggravated battery to the victim. Any murder is wantonly vile, horrible, and inhuman if the victim is less than 13 years of age; 
 The murder was committed against a law enforcement officer, employee of a corrections institution, or firefighter while engaged in the performance of such person's official duties; 
 The murder was committed by a person in, or who has escaped from, the lawful custody of a law enforcement officer or place of lawful confinement; 
 The murder was committed for the purpose of avoiding, interfering with, or preventing a lawful arrest or custody in a place of lawful confinement, of the defendant or another; 
 The murder was committed in the course of manufacturing, distributing, or dispensing illegal substances.

Early history
South Dakota executed four men between 1877 and its admission to the union in 1889, and 10 men between that time and the abolition of South Dakota's death penalty in 1915. Each of these death sentences were carried out by hanging. The death penalty was reinstated in 1939 and electric chair became the sole method. The procurement of an electric chair proved difficult for the State: in 1942, as United States entered the Second World War, the warden of the South Dakota State Penitentiary sought help from the War Production Board to have one built, but his request was denied. Two men were awaiting execution in 1942, but the state did not have an electric chair available. The warden of the South Dakota State Penitentiary, William Jamerson, traveled to Vermont in 1942, seeking to borrow that state's electric chair for use in anticipated executions in South Dakota, however it was determined that a difference in electrical conditions in South Dakota would preclude use of the Vermont chair. The warden was able to convince the state of Illinois to lend their electric chair from Stateville Prison to the South Dakota State Penitentiary the following month.

However, the two death sentences were commuted and no executions occurred in it in South Dakota. South Dakota returned the Illinois electric chair after receiving clearance from the War Production Board to obtain materials necessary to build their own electric chair in February, 1944.

The only person ever to be judicially electrocuted in South Dakota was George Sitts, who was put to death on April 8, 1947, at the South Dakota State Penitentiary. South Dakota was the second-to-last state to adopt electrocution as an execution method, and Sitts' execution was South Dakota's last until after Furman.

On January 1, 1979, Governor Bill Janklow signed South Dakota's post-Furman death penalty statute. It was the first act he signed as governor. All subsequent executions have been by lethal injection. The first occurred in 2007 with the execution of Elijah Page. Only four others have been executed since, the most recent occurring in 2019.

See also
 List of people executed in South Dakota
 List of death row inmates in South Dakota
 Crime in South Dakota

References

 
South Dakota
Crime in South Dakota
South Dakota law